Francis Mulhern is Associate Editor of New Left Review and a long-standing member of the Editorial Committee of the journal (1975–86, 2003- ).  Born in 1952, he grew up in Enniskillen, Northern Ireland, and was educated at University College Dublin and the University of Cambridge.  He has taught at universities in Ireland, Italy, Brazil and the United States.  He was for many years Professor of Critical Studies at Middlesex University, where he taught English Literature and intellectual history.  His books include
 Figures of Catastrophe: The Condition of Culture Novel (Verso, 2016)
 Culture/Metaculture (Routledge, 2000)
 The Present Lasts a Long Time: Essays in cultural politics (Cork University Press, 1998)
 The Moment of 'Scrutiny'  (NLB>Verso, 1979)

Edited works include
Roberto Schwarz, Two Girls and Other Essays (Verso, 2012)
Lives on the Left: Interviews with New Left Review (Verso, 2011)
Contemporary Marxist Literary Criticism (Longman, 1992)
Raymond Williams, What I Came to Say (with Jenny Bourne Taylor and Neil Belton, Hutchinson Radius, 1989)

Articles in New Left Review include

External links 
The Johns Hopkins University

Literary theorists
Living people
Year of birth missing (living people)